Danish Architecture Center (Danish: Dansk Arkitektur Center), (DAC), is Denmark’s national center for the development and dissemination of knowledge about architecture, building and urban development.

DAC’s objective and legitimacy consist in promoting co-operation across the professional boundaries of the construction sector and architecture so that the players, working together, are able to contribute to the forward-looking development of architecture and construction specifically and Danish society in general.

The DAC’s core funding is provided by a public-private partnership between Realdania and the Danish government. The government is represented by: the Ministry of Business Denmark and the Ministry of Culture Denmark.

History
DAC was founded in 1985 through a collaboration between the Danish Ministry of Culture, the Ministry of Economic and Business Affairs and the Realdania foundation.

See also
 Architecture of Denmark

References

External links

 Official website

Museums in Copenhagen
Architecture museums
Organizations based in Copenhagen